The Hollywood Museum  is a museum in Hollywood, California, that houses a collection of memorabilia from the history of American motion pictures and television. It is housed in the historic Max Factor Building on Highland Avenue designed by American architect Simeon Charles Lee.

The collection of the Hollywood Museum contains over 11,000 items, including costumes, props, stop motion figures, photographs, scripts, and other artifacts. Among the exhibits are the original four makeup rooms used by pioneering Hollywood makeup artist Max Factor—one for redheads, one for blondes, one for brownettes, and one for brunettes.

The museum is connected to a branch of Mel's Drive-In restaurant.

History

The building that houses the museum was originally purchased by in 1928 by legendary make-up artist to the stars Max Factor. The building was sold to the Hollywood Museum in 1994 and after nine years of renovations, the museum opened to the public in 2003. 

In June 2016, during LGBT Pride Month, the museum hosted an exhibition called "Reel to Real: Portrayals and Perceptions of Gays in Hollywood".

The museum was closed for 17 months in 2020 and 2021 due to the COVID-19 pandemic. It reopened in August 2021.

References

Cinema museums in California
History museums in Hollywood, Los Angeles
Cinema of Southern California